Planomicrobium alkanoclasticum is a Gram-positive, aerobic and chemoorganotrophic bacterium from the genus of Planomicrobium.

References

External links
Type strain of Planomicrobium alkanoclasticum at BacDive -  the Bacterial Diversity Metadatabase

Bacillales
Bacteria described in 2001